2013 K League may refer to:

 2013 K League Classic (1st Division)
 2013 K League Challenge (2nd Division)